Saint Joseph's Cathedral, also called the  Chaldean Cathedral of Aleppo, is the cathedral in Aleppo, Syria, of the Chaldean Catholic Eparchy of Aleppo of the Chaldean Catholic Church.

The eparchy has been operating since 1957 when it was created by Pope Pius XII through the Bull Quasi Pastor. Its titular bishop is Antoine Audo, S.J. The cathedral is dedicated to Saint Joseph, considered by Christians to be the adoptive father of Jesus.

It is the episcopal seat of 14 parishes (in 2009) attended by a dozen priests who work for about 35,000 baptised (in 2009).

See also
Catholic Church in Syria

References

Eastern Catholic cathedrals in Syria
Joseph
Churches completed in 1957
Aleppo